Wanchai Jarunongkran (born December 18, 1996), simply known as Chai, is a Thai professional footballer who plays as a left back for Thai League 1 club Bangkok United.

International career
On December 2017, he play for Thailand U23 in the 2017 M-150 Cup and 2018 he squad for the 2018 AFC U-23 Championship in China.

References

External links

1996 births
Living people
Wanchai Jarunongkran
Wanchai Jarunongkran
Association football fullbacks
Wanchai Jarunongkran
Wanchai Jarunongkran
Footballers at the 2018 Asian Games
Wanchai Jarunongkran
Wanchai Jarunongkran
Wanchai Jarunongkran
Wanchai Jarunongkran